Hassan Yunus (1907 – 12 July 1968) was the State Mufti serving from 1941 to 1947 and Menteri Besar serving from 1959 to 1967 of Johor, Malaysia. He was a member of the United Malays National Organisation (UMNO), a component party of Barisan Nasional (formerly Alliance Party) coalition.

Awards and recognitions

Honours of Malaysia
  :
  Companion of the Order of the Defender of the Realm (JMN) (1958)
  Commander of the Order of the Defender of the Realm (PMN) – Tan Sri (1962)
 :
  Recipient of the Malaysian Commemorative Medal (Gold) (PPM) (1965)
  :
  Knight Grand Commander of the Order of the Crown of Johor (SPMJ) – Dato’ (1959)
 First Class of the Sultan Ibrahim Medal (PIS I) (1961)

Places named after him
Several places were named after him, including:
Tan Sri Dato' Haji Hassan Yunos Stadium in Johor Bahru, Johor
Jalan Dato Haji Hassan Yunus in Bandar Penawar, Johor
SMK Dato Haji Hassan Yunus, a secondary school in Renggam, Johor

References

External links
 Johor Menteri Besar Office, Menteri Besar Biography, Tan Sri Hj. Hassan Yunus
 Johorean Student Society, Persatuan Mahasiswa Anak Johor (PERMAJ), National University of Malaysia, Universiti Kebangsaan Malaysia (UKM)
 Johor Mufti Department, Johor Mufti List, Tan Sri Datuk Hj Hassan bin Yunus (1941–1947)

1907 births
1968 deaths
People from Johor
People from Muar
Malaysian people of Malay descent
Malaysian Muslims
United Malays National Organisation politicians
Members of the Johor State Legislative Assembly
Johor state executive councillors
Chief Ministers of Johor
Commanders of the Order of the Defender of the Realm
Companions of the Order of the Defender of the Realm
Knights Grand Commander of the Order of the Crown of Johor